Heshen (1 July 1750 – 22 February 1799) of the Manchu Niohuru clan, was an official of the Qing dynasty favored by the Qianlong Emperor and called the most corrupt official in Chinese history. After the death of Qianlong, the Jiaqing Emperor confiscated Heshen's wealth and forced him to commit suicide. As an official, he acquired an estimated at 1.1 billion taels of silver, equal to roughly USD $270 billion. Heshen is remembered as one of the richest men in history.

Born Shanbao (Shan-pao), his name was later changed to Heshen. His courtesy name was Zhizhai (Chih-chai). He was a member of the Plain Red Banner.

Ascendance
Heshen was the son of a Manchu military officer and studied at a school for Manchu aristocratic boys. He lost his mother when he was young and it was said he and his younger brother had a hard life under his stepmother. However, Heshen was an excellent student, knowing  Middle Mandarin, Manchu, Mongolian and Tibetan. In 1772, he began work in the Imperial Palace, assigned as an imperial bodyguard stationed at the gates to the Forbidden City.

Within a year of his initial employment, Heshen was promoted to vice-president of the Ministry of Revenue, and two months later was made a Grand Councilor. Within three months, he was promoted even further to the Minister of the Imperial Household Department, a post usually filled with the most meritorious officials. In 1777, at the age of 27, Heshen was given the privilege of riding a horse within the Forbidden City, a prestigious privilege given only to high-ranking officials of elderly age. It was not long before Heshen was given control of both the Ministry of Revenue and the Civil Council, allowing him to control the revenue of the entire empire, and appoint his own henchmen to important posts within the officials.

The Salar Jahriyya Sufi revolt was put down by Fuk'anggan along with Agui and Li Shiyao Gansu in 1784, but Heshen was recalled for his failure during the revolt.

Heshen's hold on the Qianlong Emperor was further strengthened when in 1790, his own son was married to the emperor's tenth and favorite daughter, Hexiao. Once secure of the Qianlong Emperor's favor and approbation, Heshen enjoyed great freedom of action. He became openly corrupt and practiced extortion on a grand scale. His supporters within the imperial system followed his lead, and his military associates prolonged campaigns in order to continue the benefits of additional funds. He abrogated powers and official posts, including that of Grand Councilor, and regularly stole public funds and tax revenue. Taxes were raised again and again, and this led to the suffering of the people. Unfortunately, their suffering was compounded by severe floods of the Yellow River - an indirect result of the corruption where officials pocketed funds that were meant for the upkeep of canals and dams. Rising prices of rice led to many that simply starved to death. This widespread corruption and nepotism was the start of a century that led to the downfall of the Qing Dynasty.

In 1793, Heshen was responsible for hosting the Macartney Embassy to the imperial court.

Fall

After the Qianlong Emperor abdicated in February 1796, the range and damage of Heshen's corruption was now clear. However, Qianlong continued to rule China behind the scenes under the grand title of Taishang Huang (Retired Emperor). It was not until Qianlong's death on 7February 1799 that his successor, the Jiaqing Emperor, was able to prosecute Heshen. Just five days later, Heshen was arrested along with Minister Du Daozhao. Declared guilty by an imperial edict, he was condemned to slow slicing. The Jiaqing Emperor spared Heshen this dishonorable death out of respect for his half-sister Gurun Princess Hexiao, and instead ordered him to commit suicide by hanging. He carried out the sentence with a rope of golden silk in his home on 22 February.

In the 24 years that Heshen enjoyed the Emperor's attention and favor he amassed a fortune. In the Jiaqing Emperor's confiscation of Heshen's property, his estate included:

2,790 rooms in his estates and mansions,  of land, 10 bank branches, 10 pawnbroker branches, 58,000 taels of pure gold, 100 large ingots of pure gold, (1,000 taels each), 56,600 medium silver ingots, (100 taels each), 5,830,000 small silver ingots, (10 taels each), 58,000  foreign silver dollars, 1,500,000 copper coins, 300 kilograms of top-quality Jilin ginseng, 1,200 jade charms, 230 pearl bracelets, 10 large pearls, 10 large rubies, and dozens of place settings in solid gold or silver. He also had 14,300 bolts of fine silk, 20,000 sheets of fine sheep-fur wool, 550 fox hides, 850 raccoon dog hides, 56,000 sheep and cattle hides of varying thickness, 7,000 sets of fine clothing (for all four seasons), 361,000 bronze and tin vases and vessels, 100,000 porcelain vessels made by famous masters, 24 highly decorative solid-gold beds (each with eight different types of inlaid gemstones), and 460 high quality European clocks.

His total property was ultimately estimated at around 1,100 million taels of silver, reputed to be equivalent to the imperial revenue of the Qing government for 15 years. Treasures discovered in his chief butler Liu Quan's quarter included 240,000 silver taels. The Jiaqing Emperor charged Heshen with 20 crimes, including various abuses of power, disrespecting imperial prerogatives, and hoarding wealth.

Heshen exemplified the widespread corruption of the civil bureaucracy and military under the Qing dynasty, inherited from the preceding Ming dynasty. Bannermen developed habits that made them useless as a military force. The Chinese Green Standard Army was beset with irregular practice and had lost much of its fighting spirit shown in the early Qing Dynasty. The Qianlong Emperor's Ten Great Campaigns were completed at the cost of 120 million taels against an annual revenue of some 40 million taels, depressed by embezzling from officials such as Heshen. These massive government spendings contributed to financial instability during the later part of the Qing Dynasty.

In popular culture
For more than two hundred years Heshen has been a stock villain role, and continues to appear in theatrical, film and television productions. Chinese actors Wang Gang and Chen Rui have portrayed Heshen on screen: the former gave the character of Heshen a comical touch with his plump figure; the latter, who played Heshen in the 2003 television series Qianlong Dynasty, was said to resemble the historical Heshen more closely as compared to Wang Gang.

Hong Kong actor Ruco Chan played Heshen in the 2018 TVB series Succession War, a fictional depiction of the final 28 days of his life.

Alternative views

It could be argued that Heshen's wealth was largely from gifts of the Qianlong Emperor, not from corrupt actions. The view of Heshen as a corrupt official originated after his death and from documents in Qing Dynasty historical archives. Only the emperor had the authority to determine what content was to be kept in those archives, which raises the possibility of bias against Heshen. Heshen, as a powerful official, threatened the authority of the Jiaqing Emperor. Officials during the Qianlong Emperor's reign may have feared or been jealous of his power. The Jiaqing Emperor could have used legal pretexts to legitimize these feelings and condemn Heshen to a death sentence.

Former residence

Several decades after Heshen's death, his former residence was given to Prince Gong as his official residence. The estate, known as the Prince Gong Mansion, is now preserved as a museum and a tourist attraction. It is located at 17 Qianhai Road West in Beijing.

Family
Maternal great-grandfather
A La Na (阿喇納),  Deputy General, Count of the Third Rank (副將軍三等伯)
Maternal grandfather
Wumi Tai (伍彌泰) (1713–1786), a Mongol of the Plain Yellow Banner
Maternal grandmother
Lady Liugiya (劉佳氏)
Father
Changbao (常保), Banner vice-commander of Fujian (福建副都統)
Mother
Lady Wumi (伍彌氏)
Younger brother
Helin (和琳) (26 August 1753 – 28 September 1796), father of Fengshen Yimian and two daughters
Younger sister-in-law
Lady Tatara (他他拉氏), daughter of Sulinga (蘇凌阿), mother of Fengshen Yimian
Nephew
Fengshen Yimian (豐紳宜綿) (1755–1813)
Nieces
Two daughters of Helin
Wife
Feng Jiwen (馮霽雯), granddaughter of Feng Yinglian (馮英廉); mother of Fengšeninde, Heshen's second son, and Heshen's three daughters
Concubine
Lady Chang (長氏)
Sons
Fengšeninde (豐紳殷德) (18 February 1775 – May 1810), married Gurun Princess Hexiao (固倫和孝公主)
second son (1794–?)
Daughters
Three daughters，including Primary consort of Yongyun (Prince Chun (淳) peerage)

Genealogic tree

References

External links
The Qing Dynasty at All Empires

1750 births
1799 deaths
Qing dynasty politicians from Beijing
Forced suicides of Chinese people
Grand Councillors of the Qing dynasty
Grand Secretaries of the Qing dynasty
Assistant Grand Secretaries
Manchu Plain Red Bannermen
Manchu politicians
Niohuru clan